The Women's Super-G competition at the 2007 World Championships was held on Tuesday, February 6.

The race was scheduled to start at 11:00 CET.

Results

References

Women's Super-G
2007 in Swedish women's sport